Pablo Albano and Luis Lobo were the defending champions, but they didn't compete this year.

Dinu Pescariu and Davide Sanguinetti won the title by defeating Dominik Hrbatý and Karol Kučera 7–6, 6–4 in the final.

Seeds

Draw

Draw

References

External links
 Official results archive (ATP)
 Official results archive (ITF)

Croatia Open Umag - Doubles
1997 Doubles
1997 in Croatian tennis